Niranjan Madhav also known as Niranjan Madhav Parasnis (1703-1790) was a diplomat and poet, who worked as Parasnis under Peshwa Bajirao I. He was sent on diplomatic assignments to Karnataka and Tamil Nadu by Bajirao I and Balaji Bajirao.

In 1735, Niranjan Madhav was appointed as the Parasnis by Peshwa Bajirao I.

Madhav is remembered for his splendid contribution to the Maratha Empire by way of loyalty, and diplomacy.

Early life 
According to Akbharats and the Poona Jagirdar Parasnis collections of Persian despatches from Delhi, Niranjan Madhav was born in 1703 in a prominent Deshastha Rigvedi Brahmin family of Vishvamitra gotra in Satara, Maratha Empire (present-day Maharashtra, India).

Works
Niranjan Madhav was initiated into the mysteries of the spiritual lore and wrote five works, finishing some at Poona and some others at Srirangapattana. He unlocked a temple at Belur Chenna Keshava.
Niranjan Madhav composed Subhadra Swayamvara Champu. This akhyana contains prose and poetry, which is a significant contribution to Marathi akhyana.This is a Swayamvar Kavya describing the marriage between Arjuna and Subhadra.

In 1760, Niranjan Madhav composed Jnaneshwar Vijay, on life of Dnyaneshwar.It is based on the work of Namdev and is more a laudatory poem than a biography.

References

Bibliography

1703 births
1790 deaths
Indian diplomats
Indian male poets